Friends were a band from Brooklyn, New York formed in September 2010 and disbanded sometime in 2013. The band, originally named Perpetual Crush, consisted of Samantha Urbani (vocals), Lesley Hann (bass, percussion, backing vocals), Nikki Shapiro (guitar, keyboards, percussion), Matthew Molnar (keyboards, percussion, bass, and brother of Charley Molnar, former head football coach at UMass) and Oliver Duncan (drums).

The group released the singles "Friend Crush" and "I'm His Girl" in 2011. On April 10, 2012, BBC Radio 1 DJ Huw Stephens selected the band's third single, "Mind Control", as his Hottest Record in the World.

Friends were named one of NME's top 50 artists of 2011 and were nominated for the BBC's poll 'Sound of 2012'. Their music has been described as eclectic; "One moment it's indie pop, the next it's mutant funk, then disco - something that sounds only of itself, even as the echoes of the past flit through the songs."

Discography

Studio albums

Singles

References

External links 

Musical groups from Brooklyn
Musical groups established in 2010
Musical groups disestablished in 2013
Dance-punk musical groups
Fat Possum Records artists
2010 establishments in New York City